Dali Chu (also Romanized as  Dālī Chū and Dalīchoo; also known as Dā’ī Chū and Dālūchū) is a village in Mehraban-e Sofla Rural District, Gol Tappeh District, Kabudarahang County, Hamadan Province, Iran. At the 2006 census, its population was 470, in 100 families.

References 

Populated places in Kabudarahang County